Kenneth Victor Bainbridge (15 January 1921 – June 2011) was an English professional footballer who played as a left-winger in the Football League for West Ham United, Reading and Southend United.

Bainbridge played for West Ham United between 1946 and 1949. He scored on 11 seconds in a 2–1 win over Barnsley, the quickest recorded goal at Upton Park, in a Second Division game on 29 August 1949. He played a total of 83 league and cup games for the east London club, scoring 17 goals. He also recorded five goals in the  war-time League South. He went on to play for Reading and Southend United, and later for Southern League club Chelmsford City.

Death
He died in 2011, aged 90.

References

1921 births
2011 deaths
Place of death missing
Footballers from Barking, London
English footballers
Association football wingers
West Ham United F.C. players
Reading F.C. players
Southend United F.C. players
English Football League players
Chelmsford City F.C. players